Fruit Bat(s) or Fruitbat(s) may refer to:
 Fruit bat or Megabat, a suborder of bats that eat fruit
 Fruit Bats (band), an American band
 Fruitbat (born 1958; Les Carter), English musician and guitarist of Carter the Unstoppable Sex Machine
"Fruitbat" (Bluey), an episode of the first season of the animated TV series Bluey